Carey is an unincorporated community in Childress County, Texas, United States.

Geography 
Carey is located at  (34.471173, -100.325673).

References 

Unincorporated communities in Childress County, Texas
Unincorporated communities in Texas